Micha Powell (born January 12, 1995 in Montreal, Quebec) is a Canadian track and field athlete competing in the sprint events, predominantly the 400m event.

Her parents are former Canadian Olympic track and field medalist Rosey Edeh and current world record holder in the long jump Mike Powell.

References

External links 
 

1995 births
Living people
Athletes from Montreal
Canadian female sprinters
Black Canadian track and field athletes
Black Canadian sportswomen
Canadian sportspeople of Nigerian descent
Canadian people of African-American descent
Anglophone Quebec people
Commonwealth Games gold medallists for Canada
Commonwealth Games medallists in athletics
Athletes (track and field) at the 2022 Commonwealth Games
20th-century Canadian women
21st-century Canadian women
Medallists at the 2022 Commonwealth Games